28S ribosomal protein S21, mitochondrial is a protein that in humans is encoded by the MRPS21 gene.

Mammalian mitochondrial ribosomal proteins are encoded by nuclear genes and assist protein synthesis within the mitochondrion. Mitochondrial ribosomes (mitoribosomes) consist of a small 28S subunit and a large 39S subunit. They have an estimated 75% protein to rRNA composition compared to prokaryotic ribosomes, where this ratio is reversed. Another difference between mammalian mitoribosomes and prokaryotic ribosomes is that the latter contain a 5S rRNA. Among different species, the proteins comprising the mitoribosome differ greatly in sequence, and sometimes in biochemical properties, which prevents easy recognition by sequence homology. This gene encodes a 28S subunit protein that belongs to the ribosomal protein S21P family. Pseudogenes corresponding to this gene are found on chromosomes 1p, 1q, 9p, 10p, 10q, 16q, and 17q. Available sequence data analyses identified splice variants that differ in the 5' UTR; both transcripts encode the same protein.

References

Further reading

Ribosomal proteins